Dhale or Dhala, also spelled Dali and Dhalea and sometimes prefixed with Al or Ad, is the capital town of Dhale Governorate in south-western Yemen.

History
Formerly it was the capital of the Emirate of Dhala.

Climate

Economy

Historically, the Jewish community produced cotton thread.

References

Populated places in Dhale Governorate